Szymon Josiah Borzestowski (18 February 1989 – 2 December 2012), known by his stage name Szymon, was an Australian musician. His debut album, Tigersapp, was released three years after his death and was nominated for a 2015 ARIA Award for Best Adult Contemporary Album and debuted at #21 on the ARIA Albums Chart.

Szymon started working on his album when he was eighteen years old. Production was put on hold in early 2010 due to mental health issues. After Szymon killed himself in 2012, Mark Holland, a producer from EMI, continued mixing the songs, and the final result was released in August 2015, titled Tigersapp.

Szymon's younger brother Dom, who is known by others as Donnie, is the drummer of the Australian indie rock group Gang of Youths.

Discography
 Tigersapp (21 August 2015)

 Blue Coloured Mountain (8 November 2019)

References

Musicians from New South Wales
2012 deaths
1989 births